Connad Cerr (Connad the Left-handed) was a king of Dál Riata in the early 7th century. He was either a son of Conall mac Comgaill or of Eochaid Buide. Connad appears to have been joint king with Eochaid Buide in the 620s.

He is named as king of Dál Riata in 627 when he won a victory over Fiachnae mac Demmáin, king of the Ulaid at Ard Corann. Connad was killed at Fid Eóin, fighting against the Dál nAraidi led by Máel Caích, brother of Congal Cáech. While the Annals of Ulster have the battle in 629 and the Annals of Tigernach in 630, both place the death of Connad before the death of Eochaid Buide.

Connad's son Ferchar was later king. An entry in the Book of Ballymote associates Connad's descendants with "the men of Fife".

References
 Anderson, Alan Orr, Early Sources of Scottish History A.D 500–1286, volume 1. Reprinted with corrections. Paul Watkins, Stamford, 1990. 
 Bannerman, John, Studies in the History of Dalriada. Edinburgh: Scottish Academic Press, 1974.

External links
CELT: Corpus of Electronic Texts at University College Cork includes the Annals of Ulster, Tigernach, the Four Masters and Innisfallen, the Chronicon Scotorum, the Lebor Bretnach (which includes the Duan Albanach), Genealogies, and various Saints' Lives. Most are translated into English, or translations are in progress.

629 deaths
Kings of Dál Riata
7th-century Irish monarchs
7th-century Scottish monarchs
Year of birth unknown